Ergal may refer to:
a commercial name of 7075 aluminium alloy
a dated term for "potential energy" in thermodynamics, see Thermodynamic potential